The following list is a filmography of all animated short subjects distributed by the Metro-Goldwyn-Mayer (MGM) motion picture studio through Loew's Incorporated between 1930 and 1958 and between 1961 and 1967.

Between 1937 and 1957, MGM ran an in-house cartoon studio which produced shorts featuring the characters Barney Bear, Droopy, Red Hot Riding Hood & The Wolf, Screwy Squirrel, George and Junior, Spike, Spike and Tyke, and their best-known work, Tom and Jerry. Outside producers included Ub Iwerks (1930-34), Hugh Harman and Rudolf Ising (1934–38), William L. Snyder (1961–62), and Chuck Jones (1963–67, via MGM Animation/Visual Arts).

Ub Iwerks Studio films (1930–1934) 
Note: None of the shorts has credited directors.

Harman-Ising Studio films (1934–1938)

Metro-Goldwyn-Mayer Cartoon Studio films (1938–1958)

Rembrandt Films (1961–1962)

MGM Animation/Visual Arts (1963–1967)

References

Bibliography 
 Iwerks, Leslie and Kenworthy, John. (2001): The Hand Behind the Mouse. Disney Editions.
 Maltin, Leonard (1987): Of Mice and Magic: A History of American Animated Cartoons. Penguin Books.
 Lenburg, Jeff (1993): The Great Cartoon Directors. Da Capo Press.
 Moritz, William (2004): Optical Poetry: The Life and Work of Oskar Fischinger. John Libbey Publishing.

 
Metro-Goldwyn-Mayer cartoon studio
MGM Animation/Visual Arts
Rembrandt Films
Lists of animated cartoons